Rajkot Greenfield International Airport, also known as Hirasar Airport  is an international airport and a greenfield airport under construction at Hirasar, Gujarat, India, which will serve the city of Rajkot and the Saurashtra region. It is being constructed near the National Highway 8B (NH-8B) connecting Ahmedabad and Rajkot. It will have a single runway for the operation of ‘C’ category aircraft.

History 
The site clearance approval for the airport was granted by the Government of India in May 2017. Prime Minister Narendra Modi presided over the groundbreaking ceremony held on 7 October 2017. The Union ministry of Environment, Forest and Climate change (MoEF) accorded environmental clearance (EC) to the project on 10 October 2017.

Land acquisition issues delayed the tendering process by a few months. Afcons, Dilip Buildcon, Gayatri Projects, Larsen & Toubro and Reliance Infrastructure were among the bidders for the Engineering, procurement, and construction (EPC) tender floated by AAI. The financial bids were opened on 9 August 2018 and Dilip Buildcon emerged as the lowest bidder. The Cabinet Committee on Economic Affairs gave its approval for the project on 28 February 2019. Subsequently, in March 2019, Reliance Infrastructure was awarded the EPC contract worth  to construct the airport. The construction is to be completed within 30 months. The contract also requires the contractor to provide operation and maintenance services for a period of two years following the commissioning of the project.

Infrastructure
The airport will be capable of handling Airbus A380, Boeing 747 and Boeing 777 type of wide body aircraft, and will have a rainwater harvesting system, solar power system and a green belt along its periphery to act as a noise barrier. It will have a built-up area of 23,000 sq.m. and will have an Air Traffic Control (ATC) tower, four aerobridges, an apron suitable for parking of 14 aircraft, three conveyor belts, 20 check-in counters, advanced firefighting systems along with modern and efficient passenger facilities. It will be capable of serving over 1,800 passengers during peak hours. The facade design of the terminal is based on the Ranjit Vilas Palace and various traditional art forms like Dandiya dance, a renowned dance form of Gujarat.

See also
 Rajkot Airport

References

Airports in Gujarat
International airports in India
Proposed airports in Gujarat
Buildings and structures in Rajkot
Transport in Rajkot